WASG (540 AM) is an American radio station licensed by the Federal Communications Commission (FCC) to serve the community of Daphne, Alabama.  The station broadcasts an Urban Gospel music and preaching format.

The station was assigned the WASG call letters by the FCC on January 5, 1981.

In the fall of 2016 the station began to be heard on FM translator W291CY on 106.1 MHz. (Taken From Alabama Broadcast Media Page)

References

External links

Gospel radio stations in the United States
ASG
Radio stations established in 1981
1981 establishments in Alabama